Simon Miller (born 5 May 2001) is a South African rugby union player for the  in the Currie Cup. His regular position is lock or flanker.

Miller was named in the  squad for the 2021 Currie Cup Premier Division. He made his debut for them in Round 7 of the Currie Cup against the .He made his debut for the Stormers in 2023 against London Irish in England. Miller represented the SA Schools team in 2019 and went on to captain the u/21 Western Province side whilst studying at Stellenbosch University.

References

South African rugby union players
Rugby union locks
Rugby union flankers
Western Province (rugby union) players
Stormers players
2001 births
Living people